The Virginia Department of Forensic Science (DFS) is a state agency of the Commonwealth of Virginia. Its purpose is to provide laboratory services in criminal matters in Virginia and to increase understanding of forensic science in general.

In 1972, DFS was first formed as a bureau attached to the Division of Consolidated Laboratory Services (DCLS). This bureau became a division in 1990, and a department in 2005. The current director, Linda Jackson, has been director of DFS since February 2013. DFS reports to the Governor's Secretary of Public Safety.

References

External links
 Official website

Specialist law enforcement agencies of the United States
State law enforcement agencies of Virginia
1972 establishments in Virginia